Hirafuku Hyakusui, originally named Teizō (Japanese: 平福 百穂; 28 December 1877, Kakunodate - 30 October 1933, Kakunodate) was a Japanese painter in the nihonga style.

Life and work 
His father, was also a painter and gave him his first lessons. Three years later, he enrolled at the Tokyo Art School (now the Tokyo University of the Arts) and studied nihonga style art.

In 1914, he won some awards at the eighth exhibition (Bunten) of the Ministry of Culture. Two years later, he joined with Kaburagi Kiyokata, Matsuoka Eikyū and others to create another artists' group, the "" (Golden Bell), which promoted artistic freedom and personal expression. In 1922, he became a judge for the Teiten exhibition; successor to the Bunten.

In 1930, he was able to visit Rome to participate in an exhibition of Japanese artists. The following year, he was involved in a similar exhibition at the Prussian Academy of Arts in Berlin. Upon his return to Japan, he was named a member of the Japan Art Academy. In 1932, he became a teacher at the Tokyo Fine Arts School, but died after having served for only a little more than a year.

His mature works combined the official nihonga style with the lighter techniques of the Rinpa school. He also showed some influence from the Chinese-based Nanga style. In addition, he wrote some poetry which was published in the literary magazine Araragi and collected in an anthology called "Kanchiku" (Chinese Bamboos).

A major exhibition of his small paintings and scroll hangings was held at the Gallery Gunji (Tokyo) in April, 2019.

Sources 
 Tazawa Yutaka: Biographical Dictionary of Japanese Art. Kodansha International, 1981. .
 Laurance P. Roberts: A Dictionary of Japanese Artists. Weatherhill, 1976. .

References

External links 

More works by Hirafuku @ ArtNet
Works by Hirafuku @ the Carnegie Museum of Art

1877 births
1933 deaths
Nihonga painters
Rinpa school
Artists from Akita Prefecture